Keeri-Karijärve Nature Reserve is a nature reserve situated in south-eastern Estonia, in Tartu County.

Keeri-Karijärve Nature Reserve serves to protect an area of unusual flooded meadows around Elva River and a number of lakes. It also includes areas of old-growth forest. This environment is an important habitat for a number of protected bird species, including four species of eagle; most notably, the greater spotted eagle. The waters of the nature reserve also contain a number of protected species of fish, e.g. asp, loach and European weatherfish.

For visitors, a hiking trail and an overnight shelter has been prepared. Arrangements have also been made that allow visitors to explore the area by boat.

References

Nature reserves in Estonia
Geography of Tartu County
Elva Parish
Nõo Parish